Songbird (Melissa Gold), formerly known as Screaming Mimi, is a fictional superhero appearing in American comic books published by Marvel Comics. Originally a supervillain, she possesses supersonic sound abilities that can cause a variety of effects.

Publication history

The character first appeared as Screaming Mimi in Marvel Two-in-One #54 (August, 1979), and was created by Mark Gruenwald, Ralph Macchio, and John Byrne.

She made numerous appearances as a supervillain before taking on a new role as a superhero in the Thunderbolts series.

After some time away from the team, she returned as a regular character in Thunderbolts beginning with issue #144, and appeared as a supporting character when the title transitioned into Dark Avengers beginning with issue #175.

In June 2015, Songbird was announced as a team member in the relaunched New Avengers, part of the "All-New, All-Different Marvel" branding.

Fictional character biography
Melissa Gold was a troubled runaway from an alcoholic father and incarcerated mother. To survive on the streets, Melissa developed a hard edge to her personality, referring to herself as "Mimi". She was eventually imprisoned, where she met Poundcakes, a female wrestler who invited her to join the Grapplers under the name Screaming Mimi, alongside Titania and Letha. The Grapplers became renowned for their colorful personalities and ringside antics, but the wrestling federation denied them the opportunity to make the amount of money their male counterparts made. Instead, the group agreed to earn supplementary income by performing a covert operation for the Roxxon Oil Company. Roxxon gave the Grapplers special paraphernalia to assist them in their mission; Mimi received an apparatus that converted her voice to high-frequency sonics for various effects. The Grapplers tested these powers by fighting Thundra in a wrestling ring. On their mission, Thundra led them into Project Pegasus to smuggle in the Nth Projector for Roxxon. The mission failed when they were defeated by the heroes Quasar and Giant-Man. The Grapplers were tried and jailed for their misdeeds. Alongside the Grapplers, she victimized Dazzler while she was in Ryker's Island prison with them. When the Grapplers were finally paroled, they discovered that the women's wrestling movement had lost its momentum without them, so they continued to perform crimes to support themselves and working as professional criminals. Alongside the Grapplers, Mimi attempted to attack the Thing while he was in the hospital, and battled Captain America. Later, the Grapplers set their sights on a women's division of the superpowered Unlimited Class Wrestling Federation. Their manager, Auntie Freeze, arranged for the women to augment their natural abilities with artificial powers created by the agency Power Broker, Inc.  While the other Grapplers received superhuman strength, Mimi instead had her vocal enhancements internalized as a throat implant. (It was believed that Mimi had also gained superhuman strength, however by her own account to Mach-1 it was only the other Grapplers that were augmented.) The all-new Grapplers made a legitimate professional comeback that proved short-lived. When Titania was murdered by the vigilante Scourge, Mimi was among the female wrestlers of the Unlimited Class Wrestling Federation who participated in a mass attack upon the Thing, blaming him for Titania's death. After Letha was later also killed by Scourge, the Grapplers broke up.

Mimi was later contacted by the criminal Baron Helmut Zemo to join his version of the Masters of Evil. Her first assignment was to help bust the female Yellowjacket out of prison, but Mimi was captured in the subsequent battle with the Wasp, Black Knight, and Paladin. She was bound and gagged and arrested. Later, she formed a romantic and criminal partnership with the similarly-empowered Angar the Screamer, at one point battling the Avengers Hawkeye and Mockingbird. The pair impersonated Hawkeye and Mockingbird, but battled them and were defeated. Mimi was also seen among the various female superhumans aboard Superia's cruise ship, where she battled Captain America and Paladin. Angar was eventually mortally wounded by a gunshot during a robbery attempt that went sour, and died in Mimi's arms after they escaped. Mad with grief, Mimi screamed, burning out her power. Immediately afterward, she was contacted by Baron Zemo once more, and she accepted his offer to join a formative Masters of Evil. Zemo allowed Mimi to be nursed back to health, and his accomplice, the Fixer, gave her new powers via a voice-augmenting harness and high-tech implants in her neck based on technology from the villain Klaw. With her newly transformed powers, she resumed the use of her given name Melissa, and adopted the identity of Songbird as a member of the Thunderbolts, a new Masters of Evil group posing as superheroes to win the world's trust while secretly plotting world conquest under Zemo's direction. However, Melissa and most of the other Thunderbolts grew to like their heroic roles. In particular, Melissa began to truly grow into her own and even began a romance with her teammate Abner Jenkins, alias MACH-1, formerly the Beetle. Ultimately, the Thunderbolts turned against Zemo, foiling his attempt at world domination and rescuing the Avengers in the process. Melissa continued to serve with the team, who operated as a team of outlaw superheroes.

Melissa stayed with the Thunderbolts through different incarnations after this, and rose to second-in-command under Hawkeye and eventually ran the team herself.  Her sonic equipment was replaced several times, both by criminal organizations and by S.H.I.E.L.D.

During the superhero "Civil War" event the Thunderbolts, including Melissa, were approached by the government to catch supervillains and rehabilitate them.

Having turned up alive after his apparent death, Lemuel Dorcas developed an obsession for Songbird where he kidnapped her and repaired her vocal cords as he intends to make Songbird his slave. However, Songbird was able to escape from Doctor Dorcas's clutches, as with the surgery restoring her persuasive powers as well, she turned Doctor Dorcas's henchmen against him.

During the "Secret Invasion" event, Songbird was attacked by a Skrull who not only had her powers, but also had the powers of Atlas and the rest of the original Thunderbolts. The Thunderbolts save her by causing this Skrull to merge into a nearby building, killing him.

During the "Dark Reign" event, Norman Osborn orders Melissa killed by other members of the Thunderbolts team, forcing her to go into hiding for a time. She gathers allies to resist Osborn.

After the "Siege" event and Osborn's subsequent downfall, Songbird has taken a position at "the Raft", as the prison's female warden. Songbird has joined the new Thunderbolts team, led by Luke Cage in large part to keep a close eye over Moonstone (whom Cage has offered a chance for freedom in exchange for her serving on the team). When Songbird objects to Moonstone's inclusion on the team due to her history of manipulation and deceit, Cage counters that Songbird herself used to be regarded the same way and that she should give Moonstone the same chances she was given by others.

Powers and abilities
As Screaming Mimi, Gold's enhanced vocal cords were bionically altered and enhanced by technicians in the employ of Roxxon. As such, she had the ability to generate a high-pitched, earsplitting, earth-shattering supersonic scream of great volume and for a variety of effects. She was capable of emitting a sound equivalent in decibels to the noise of a jet engine passing 5 feet from one's ear. She has perfect pitch, the ability to hear in her mind the correct frequency for every musical note on the scale. Every note on the scale she screams induces a different effect upon those who hear it. Low C causes low-level anxiety and shortness of breath, D causes high-level anxiety and panic attacks, E causes dizziness and vertigo, F causes nausea and stomach cramping, G causes severe headaches and fatigue, A causes blindness, B causes euphoria and eventual stupor, and high C causes the listener to visually hallucinate. By rapid oscillation between two notes, she can combine effects. In addition, she could produce certain vocal effects in harmony with Angar the Screamer, such as specific sustained illusions. Her nervous system is immune to her own vocal powers. At the upper limit of her scream's power, it could actually damage physical objects.  Faced with the death of her lover, Angar the Screamer, she screamed for 43 minutes in a fit of hysteria, creating a large blast crater and literally liquefying nearby plant life. This outburst nearly destroyed her vocal cords, and depowered her briefly until she used new technology to assume the Songbird alias. During a later encounter with the Hand, Songbird unintentionally reactivated her incredibly strong supersonic scream ability.

As Songbird, Melissa uses a derivation of technology created by the criminal Ulysses Klaw that converts sound into a malleable form of energy that has physical form and mass, termed "solid sound." She could initially create simple 3-dimensional sound/mass constructions, though as she has gained experience in her new supersonic sound abilities, she has learned to create more complex forms. She shapes and animates these by mental command, and they only remain in existence for as long as she wills them to. She can "fly" by generating solid sound "wings" attached to her body; initially, these were created as glider-style wings, stretching from wrists to feet, though more recently they are shown attached to her back.  Presumably, she animates the wings to flap or somehow generates a propulsive force with her powers, since her airborne speed and maneuverability to date extend well beyond simple gliding.

Songbird has also occasionally exhibited an ability to influence others through sub-vocal (below the level of conscious human hearing) sonics; this is more of a subtle "nudge" or subconscious suggestion rather than outright mind control. This is apparently an effect generated by the remnants of her original sonic enhancements.

As a former wrestler, she is extensively skilled in hand-to-hand combat using wrestling techniques and was well trained by Titania.

Reception

Critical reception 
Devon Lord-Moncrief of CBR.com stated, "Once a lower tier villain, Songbird masqueraded as a hero in the Thunderbolts before having a real change of heart and becoming a true hero. Not every person with superpowers starts as a hero, even if they have a good heart. Such is the unfortunate case of Melissa Gold, the former D-list villain known as Screaming Mimi. After a roller coaster of a career as a powered individual, Mellisa Gold has become a formidable force to be reckoned with, growing from petty criminal to redeemed hero. [...] Over time Melissa became a force of redemption for reforming villains. Her ventures weren't always met with great success or trust, but she ultimately proved herself to heroes such as Luke Cage. At one point she became a member of A.I.M., Avengers Idea Mechanics, Robert de Costa's reformed version of the former criminal organization Advanced Idea Mechanics. Since her adventures alongside Robert de Costa, Melissa decided to take a vacation in Belmar Beach, New Jersey. But a good hero never rests long as she was asked yet again to join The Thunderbolts, now led by the Winter Soldier. From her humble beginnings to becoming a super villain and eventually becoming a respected hero, Melissa Gold has had one of the most colorful careers in Marvel. In some ways she exists as the ultimate Marvel superhero story: a child with no future who could have traveled a hard path of crime chose instead to redeem herself and become a hero. Melissa Gold, aka Songbird, is living proof that we are the masters of our destinies and that we are all capable of greatness, regardless of our pasts."

Volumes

Thunderbolts: Breaking Point 
According to Diamond Comic Distributors, Thunderbolts: Breaking Point #1 was the 70th best-selling comic book in November 2007.

Bryan Joel of IGN gave Thunderbolts: Breaking Point #1 a grade of 6.8 out of 10, stating, "Brian Denham does a competent job at aping Mike Deodato, Jr.'s pencils, a style that's become synonymous with this Thunderbolts incarnation. And this issue also gets some major points for the Mary Jane Watson statue controversy gag, maybe the funniest thing I've seen in a comic all year. Those things out of the way though, there are a few plotting elements that keep Breaking Point from being enjoyable enough to be an equal trade for a normal Ellis/Deodato issue. For one, the team's defeat of Brother Nature in the opening pages of the issue is, well, sort of mindless. Despite the team's insistence that Radioactive Man is highly dangerous without his containment suit, they all still stand around and urge Brother Nature to be very afraid indeed. Uh, maybe run? Sell the lie? The short scene is meant to demonstrate that, as she claims, Songbird is probably a better leader than Moonstone, but it fails on a basic logical level and undermines it. But more importantly, the issue proves what most fans might suspect: there isn't much of a point. The problem with a project like this is that the writer usually doesn't have a license to do anything that would disrupt the ongoing title's plots, which is to say a license to do much of anything, and most readers know it. I'm skeptical that any of the psychological warfare shown here between the ladies will be mentioned in the monthly series. You could easily pass this issue and not miss anything. If you're desperately interested in some Songbird/Moonstone action, well, here's Breaking Point, enjoy. But I can't see most Thunderbolts aficionados feeling a burning need to grab a copy of this one, spectacular real-life controversy nod aside."

Accolades 

 In 2015, Entertainment Weekly ranked Songbird 22nd in their "Let's rank every Avenger ever" list.
 In 2020, Scary Mommy included Songbird in their "Looking For A Role Model? These 195+ Marvel Female Characters Are Truly Heroic" list.
 In 2021, Screen Rant ranked Songbird 2nd in their "Marvel Comics: The 10 Greatest Redemptions" list.
 In 2022, CBR.com ranked Songbird 3rd in their "10 Best Masters Of Evil Members" list.
 In 2022, Screen Rant included Songbird in their "10 Most Powerful Members Of The Thunderbolts" list.

Other versions

JLA/Avengers
Songbird, referred to as Screaming Mimi, is among the mind-controlled villains who attack the heroes as they assault Krona's Stronghold. She uses her scream on Hercules, but is defeated by Black Canary's Canary Cry.

Avengers Forever
A Songbird from an alternate future is one of the featured characters in the limited series Avengers Forever. In this alternate timeline, Songbird has become a member of the Avengers.

Marvel Zombies
Songbird appears alongside the Thunderbolts in the Dead Days one-shot of the Marvel Zombies miniseries attacking Thor and later Nova. She is quickly destroyed by the Invisible Woman when she tries to bite Nova.

Old Man Logan
In Old Man Hawkeye, the prequel to Old Man Logan, Songbird was part of the Thunderbolts when the team betrayed the Avengers resulting in all of their deaths with the exception of Hawkeye. Out of the members, she appeared to be the most remorseful for her actions. When Hawkeye goes on a quest to kill the former Thunderbolts for their betrayal, he finds an older Melissa at the Sanctuary of the Silent Sisterhood where she has become a nun that has taken an oath of silence. When the duo are attacked by Bullseye, she saves Clint and gives him a map to where Moonstone is before the villain stabs her with Elektra's Sai.<ref>Old Man Hawkeye #10. Marvel Comics.</ref>

In other media
Television
 Songbird appears in The Super Hero Squad Show, voiced by Julie Morrison. This version is a S.H.I.E.L.D. agent tasked by Captain America with working undercover in Doctor Doom's Lethal Legion. Introduced in "Hulk Talk Smack", she and Klaw search for Infinity Fractals on Doom's behalf. In "Deadly is the Black Widow's Bite", Screaming Mimi is sent with MODOK and the Abomination to search for another fractal, but are defeated by Mystique disguised as Black Widow per Doom's latest plot. She later joins Mystique, Abomination, MODOK, Klaw, and Toad to raid the Vault, where she reveals her true identity as Songbird and aids the Super Hero Squad in repelling the villains.
 Melissa Gold appears in Avengers Assemble, voiced by Jennifer Hale. She first appears as Screaming Mimi of the Masters of Evil in "Adapting to Change" and "Under Siege" before joining the Thunderbolts as Songbird in the group's self-titled episode and "Thunderbolts Revealed". Songbird later returns in the four-part episode "Civil War" as a member of the Mighty Avengers.
 Melissa Gold appears in the Marvel Rising short "Battle of the Bands", voiced by Tara Strong. This version is the leader of a band called "Screaming Mimi and the Thunderbolts".

Video games
 Songbird appears as a playable character and boss in Marvel: Ultimate Alliance 2, voiced by Susan Spano. Additionally, a variant of her Screaming Mimi costume appears as an alternate skin. In PS3 and Xbox 360 versions, the caring and modest Songbird is part of the Pro-Registration faction and her sound-based wings are depicted as resembling those of a butterfly rather than the avian ones she has in the comics. In the Wii, PSP, and PS2 versions, Songbird is portrayed as stubborn and malicious.
 Songbird appears as a playable DLC character in Lego Marvel's Avengers, as part of the "Thunderbolts" DLC pack.
 Songbird appears as a playable character in Marvel: Avengers Alliance.
 Songbird appears as a playable character in Marvel: Future Fight.
 Songbird appears as a playable character in Marvel Tsum Tsum.
 Songbird appears as a playable character in Lego Marvel Super Heroes 2''.

References

External links
 

Avengers (comics) characters
Characters created by John Byrne (comics)
Characters created by Mark Gruenwald
Characters created by Ralph Macchio
Comics characters introduced in 1979
Fictional characters who can manipulate sound
Fictional Jewish women
Fictional Jews in comics
Fictional professional wrestlers
Fictional women soldiers and warriors
Jewish superheroes
Marvel Comics female superheroes
Marvel Comics female supervillains
Marvel Comics martial artists
Marvel Comics mutates